Welcome Home is a 2004 Austrian comedy film directed by Andreas Gruber. It was entered into the 27th Moscow International Film Festival.

Cast
 Wolfgang S. Zechmayer as Coach
 Jaymes Butler as Ghana Police Officer
 Emmanuel Abankwa as Market Security Man
 Joseph Allruist Win
 Fred Nii Amugi as Black doctor
 Nina Blum as Karin
 Hemma Clementi as Petra
 Stephanie Commings as Librarian

References

External links
 

2004 films
2004 comedy films
Austrian comedy films
2000s German-language films